Triazolite is an organic mineral with the chemical structure of NaCu2(N3C2H2)2(NH3)2Cl3·4H2O, and is formed in conjunction with chanabayite, another natural triazolate. Triazolite has only been found in Pabellón de Pica, Chanabaya, Iquique Province, Tarapacá Region, Chile, due to its specific requirements for formation. The first specimens of triazolite were found in what is suspected to be the guano of the Guanay cormorant. The guano reacted to chalcopyrite-bearing gabbro, allowing the formation for triazolite to take place. Triazolite was initially grouped together with chanabayite in 2015, and wasn't identified as a separate mineral until 2017.

References

Organic minerals
Copper(II) minerals
Orthorhombic minerals
Chlorides